The Emblem of Jharkhand is the official seal of the government of the Indian state of Jharkhand.

Design

The emblem consists of multiple rings, in which elephants (the state animal) in green background in the outer ring, represent strength, wildlife, royalty and rich vegetation. The middle ring showcases, Palash flowers (the state flower), which are also known as 'flames of the jungle', representing rich flora, beauty and culture. The inner ring consists of people, in the unique Jharkhandi style painting, which represents rich history and strength of social bounding. The Lion Capital of Ashoka is at the centre, with the motto Satyameva Jayate.

History

The first emblem of Jharkhand was adopted on 15 November 2000 when Jharkhand state was formed from the southern part of Bihar. This emblem consisted of an Ashoka Chakra, as depicted on the national Flag of India, surrounded by four letter Js stylised as daggers. The legend underneath, Jharkhand Sarkar, translates as Government of Jharkhand.

In January 2020, the new Chief Minister of Jharkhand, Hemant Soren announced that a new state emblem is to be adopted in the near future. He stated that the new emblem should represent the culture, tradition, history and future of the state and invited entries for a new design via a public competition. A purported winning design, depicting a tree, was subsequently reported by several media outlets but this was later revealed to be a hoax.

On 22 July a new emblem was officially granted approval to be used from 15 August 2020.

Government banner
The Government of Jharkhand can be represented by a banner displaying the emblem of the state on a white field.

See also
 National Emblem of India
 List of Indian state emblems

References

Government of Jharkhand
Jharkhand
Symbols of Jharkhand
Jarkhand